Mariann Mimi Maróty  (born 10 October 1998) is a Hungarian alpine skier. 
She competed in slalom and giant slalom at the 2018 Winter Olympics.

References

1998 births
Living people
Hungarian female alpine skiers 
Olympic alpine skiers of Hungary 
Alpine skiers at the 2018 Winter Olympics